São Tomé and Príncipe has competed in seven Summer Games. They made their first appearance at the 1996 Summer Olympics in Atlanta. They have never competed in the Winter Games. The country has never won any medals at the games.

The National Olympic Committee for São Tomé and Príncipe was formed in 1979.  The International Olympic Committee recognized them in 1993.

Medal tables

Medals by Games

See also
 List of flag bearers for São Tomé and Príncipe at the Olympics
 List of participating nations at the Summer Olympic Games
 List of participating nations at the Winter Olympic Games

External links